Jon Kaplan may refer to:

 Jon Kaplan (composer) (born 1976), American composer, lyricist and comedy writer
 Jon Kaplan (theatre critic) (1947–2017), Canadian theatre critic
 Jon Kaplan (record producer), American record producer

See also
 Jonathan Kaplan (disambiguation)
 John Kaplan (disambiguation)